Gabriel Holmes (1769September 26, 1829) was the 21st Governor of the U.S. state of North Carolina from 1821 to 1824. He was not affiliated with any party; a Representative from North Carolina.

Biography
Gabriel Holmes was born near Clinton in the Province of North Carolina in 1769. He attended Zion Parnassus Academy in Rowan County and Harvard University, studied law in Raleigh, N.C., was admitted to the bar in 1790. and commenced practice in Clinton, N.C. He served in the State House of Commons 1794 and 1795; member of the State Senate 1797–1802, 1812, and 1813; Governor of North Carolina 1821–1824; elected to the Nineteenth, Twentieth, and Twenty-first Congresses and served from March 4, 1825, until his death near Clinton, Sampson County, N.C., September 26, 1829. He was Chairman of the Committee on Expenditures in the Post Office Department (Twentieth Congress).

He was buried in the John Sampson Cemetery. His body was moved there on Memorial Day, 1984, by the Sampson County Historical Society.

He was the father of the Confederate Lieutenant General Theophilus H. Holmes.

See also
List of United States Congress members who died in office (1790–1899)

References

1769 births
1829 deaths
People from Clinton, North Carolina
Governors of North Carolina
Harvard University alumni
Jacksonian members of the United States House of Representatives from North Carolina
19th-century American politicians
Democratic-Republican Party state governors of the United States
North Carolina Democratic-Republicans